13 is the eighth studio album by German rock band Die Ärzte, released on 25 May 1998. It is their most successful album, going platinum in Germany and gold in Austria and Switzerland. The 13th track, "Männer sind Schweine", is their most successful single.

The CD version of the album features a hidden track in the pregap of the first song. This technique was later used frequently—on Geräusch, Jazz ist anders, Farin Urlaub's Am Ende der Sonne, and Bela B.'s Bingo. On vinyl versions of Jazz ist anders and Am Ende der Sonne though, the hidden tracks are not lost, but put after the last track.

The album features many film and TV samples. Samples are used on tracks 1, 4, 5, 8, 10, 12, 13, 16, and on the hidden track.

Track listing

Hidden track
The song "Lady" is hidden in the pregap of "Punk ist...". It was composed by González with lyrics by González and Felsenheimer. To hear it, one has to rewind the record from the first track to -3:55.

Personnel
Farin Urlaub – guitar, vocals
Bela Felsenheimer – drums, vocals
Rodrigo González – bass guitar, vocals

Charts

Year-end charts

References

1998 albums
Die Ärzte albums
German-language albums